Lim Young-chul (born 15 June 1960) is a South Korea handball coach of the South Korean national team.

References

Living people
South Korean handball coaches
1960 births
Olympic handball players of South Korea
Handball players at the 1984 Summer Olympics
Asian Games medalists in handball
Handball players at the 1982 Asian Games
Asian Games bronze medalists for South Korea
Medalists at the 1982 Asian Games